Animal Room is a 1995 American thriller drama film directed, produced, and written by Craig Singer and starring Neil Patrick Harris as a bullied drug-using teenager and Matthew Lillard as the bully who loves to torment Harris's character. The film is referred to as a modernized version of A Clockwork Orange and features an appearance from the punk rock band Misfits.

Cast
 Neil Patrick Harris as Arnold Mosk
 Matthew Lillard as Doug Van Housen
 Catherine Hicks as Mrs. Mosk
 Amanda Peet as Debbie
 Gabriel Olds as Gary Trancer
 Michael Torpey as Shelly's brother
 Brian Vincent as Eddie LeMaster
 Stephen Pearlman as Principal Jones

References

External links
 

1995 films
1990s thriller drama films
American thriller drama films
1990s English-language films
Films about drugs
American independent films
Films shot in New Jersey
1995 drama films
1995 independent films
1990s American films